Aruna Mishra is a female Indian boxer. Her career highlights include gold medals in the 2003 Asian Championships, 2004 World Cup and the 2011 World Police and Fire Games.

References

Indian women boxers
Living people
Welterweight boxers
1979 births